Mark Andrew Rowntree (born 1956) is a British serial killer who was committed to a mental hospital after he admitted killing four people at random in the town of Bingley, West Yorkshire, during late 1975 and early 1976. Due to the timing of his spree, some of his victims were erroneously assumed to have been killed by the Yorkshire Ripper, which distracted police enquiries at the time.

On 31 December 1975, 19-year-old Rowntree stabbed widow Grace Adamson to death, then celebrated with a beer at the local pub. On 3 January 1976, he killed sixteen-year-old Stephen Wilson at a bus stop in Eastburn, West Yorkshire. The victim died in hospital, although he was first able to give a description of his attacker to the police.

On 7 January 1976, Rowntree visited part-time model Barbara Booth at her home and stabbed her to death, along with her three-year-old son Alan. By the time he returned home, the police were waiting for him, armed with the description given by the second victim. Rowntree gave a full confession to his crimes and complained that he had not managed to reach five victims — the body count of his hero, Donald Neilson.

Diagnosed with schizophrenia, Rowntree pleaded guilty to four counts of manslaughter on the ground of diminished responsibility at Leeds Crown Court in June 1976. He was ordered to be committed to Rampton Secure Hospital for an indefinite period.

He is now one of the longest serving patients in any British psychiatric/secure hospital. He changed his name to Paul Page in the late 1990s and has been allowed out on day trips from the secure hospitals he is incarcerated in.

In 1994, he partook in an adventure holiday in Kielder Forest, for which the then-Home Secretary had to apologise.

In 2003, he again changed his name to Mark Allen Evans and has also used pseudonyms in an attempt to get his novels, poetry and short stories published. In 1992, the Space rock band Hawkwind released an album titled Electric Tepee. One of the tracks on the album, Death of War, is co-credited to Mark Rowntree as the lyrics are taken from one of Rowntree's poems.

In March 2004, Evans (Rowntree) was convicted of threats to kill a social worker at the secure hospital in Middlesbrough where he was locked up. The judge detained Evans at Rampton Hospital without time limit, which has led to speculation that he will never be released.

References

Sources

1950s births
British spree killers
Crimes against sex workers
Criminals from Yorkshire
English prisoners sentenced to life imprisonment
English serial killers
Living people
Male serial killers
People acquitted by reason of insanity
People from the City of Bradford
People with schizophrenia
Prisoners sentenced to life imprisonment by England and Wales